Lewis Hobart Sweetser (January 13, 1868 – June 9, 1944) was a Republican politician from Idaho. Born in San Francisco, he attended the University of California, Class of 1889, where he was a member of the Chi Phi Fraternity.  Sweetser served as the 11th lieutenant governor of Idaho from 1909 to 1913 during the administrations of Governors James H. Brady and James H. Hawley. He lived in Burley, Idaho.

Sweetser also served in the Idaho Legislature. He was a member of the Idaho State House of Representatives from 1901 to 1902 and from 1905 to 1906. He died in Los Angeles in 1944.

References

Members of the Idaho House of Representatives
Lieutenant Governors of Idaho
University of California, Berkeley alumni
1868 births
1944 deaths